FC Borjomi is a Georgian football club based in Borjomi. Since the 2021 season they have been a member of Liga 3, the third tier of Georgian football system. 

The team has spent four seasons in the top flight.

Their home ground is Jemal Zeinklishvili Stadium.

History
Founded in 1936, FC Borjomi participated in Georgian regional championship for many years.

From 1993/94 they spent several seasons in the second and third division. In 2004/05 Borjomi finished 2nd in Liga 2 and got promoted to Umaglesi Liga, where the club competed for four seasons.

The fifth place in 2005/06 is the best result Borjomi have achieved in Georgian leagues. It is noteworthy that the club won 14 home games out of 15, including against the top three leaders.

In the 2007/08 season Borjomi won the group stage of David Kipiani Cup and reached the semifinals, but the next year the club finished in the bottom place and quit the league. 

A few years later Borjomi experienced some significant revival. Having convincingly won the third division in 2014, the next year team achieved great progress towards the return to the top league. As the runners-up, they booked a place for promotion play-off game against Lokomotive Tbilisi. This dramatic final match ended 3-3 and the winner of the tie was determined after the penalty shoot-out.   

Shortly some harsh times followed with two relegations within four seasons. Borjomi sank to a low ebb in 2019 when they failed to preserve a place in the third division. Аs a result, the head coach was replaced and 90% of players parted ways with the club. 
 
In 2021, the club won the first stage of Liga 4 competition, qualified for the Promotion Group and managed to advance back to the third league from the third place.

Seasons 
{|class="wikitable sortable" style="text-align: center"
|-bgcolor="#efefef"
! Season
! League
! Pos.
! P
! W
! D
! L
! GF
! GA
! Pts
! Cup
|-
|1993/94
|Pirveli Liga East
|13
|align=right|34||align=right|12||align=right|5||align=right|17
|align=right|48||align=right|59||align=right|41
|–
|-
|1994/95
|Pirveli Liga East
|10
|align=right|30||align=right|9||align=right|4||align=right|17
|align=right|47||align=right|70||align=right|31
|– 
|-
|1995/96
|Pirveli Liga East
|19
|align=right|36||align=right|5||align=right|4||align=right|27
|align=right|31||align=right|78||align=right|19
|–
|-
|1996/97
|Pirveli Liga East
|7
|align=right|38||align=right|21||align=right|4||align=right|13
|align=right|51||align=right|52||align=right|67
|2nd Round 
|-
|1998/99
|Pirveli Liga East
|9
|align=right|26||align=right|9||align=right|2||align=right|15
|align=right|36||align=right|42||align=right|29
|Preliminary Round 
|-
|rowspan="2"|2000/01
|Pirveli Liga
|7
|align=right|22 ||align=right|8 ||align=right|5 ||align=right|9
|align=right|22 ||align=right|19 ||align=right|29
|– 
|-
|Relegation Round
|2
|align=right|10 ||align=right|5 ||align=right|2 ||align=right|3 
|align=right|12 ||align=right|8 ||align=right|32 
|–
|-
|2001/02
|Pirveli Liga
|bgcolor=LimeGreen|12
|align=right|22||align=right|2||align=right|1||align=right|19
|align=right|16||align=right|68||align=right|7
|– 	
|-
|2002/03
|Regionuli Liga Centre
|align=right|
|align=right| ||align=right| ||align=right| ||align=right| 
|align=right| ||align=right| ||align=right| 
|–
|-
|2003/04
|Regionuli Liga Centre
|bgcolor=Gold|
|align=right| ||align=right| ||align=right| ||align=right| 
|align=right| ||align=right| ||align=right| 
|–
|-
|2004/05
|Pirveli Liga
|bgcolor=Silver|2
|align=right|30||align=right|22||align=right|3||align=right|5
|align=right|74||align=right|36||align=right|69
|1st round
|-
|2005/06
|rowspan="4"|Umaglesi Liga
|5
|align=right|30||align=right|19||align=right|2||align=right|9
|align=right|50||align=right|26||align=right|59
|Quarterfinals
|-
|2006/07
|10
|align=right|26||align=right|8||align=right|6||align=right|12
|align=right|29||align=right|35||align=right|30
|Quarterfinals
|-
|2007/08
|9
|align=right|26||align=right|9||align=right|4||align=right|13
|align=right|32||align=right|39||align=right|31
|Semifinals
|-
|2008/09
|bgcolor=LimeGreen|11
|align=right|30 ||align=right|2 ||align=right|7 ||align=right|21
|align=right|21 ||align=right|85 ||align=right|13
|Round of 32
|-
|2013/14
|Meore Liga
|bgcolor=Gold|1
|align=right|30 ||align=right|24 ||align=right|5 ||align=right|1
|align=right|107 ||align=right|25 ||align=right|77
|–
|-
|2014/15
|Pirveli Liga, B
|bgcolor=Silver|2
|align=right|30 ||align=right|16 ||align=right|6 ||align=right|14
|align=right|40 ||align=right|43 ||align=right|54
|–
|-
|2015/16
|Pirveli Liga 
|4
|align=right|34 ||align=right|17 ||align=right|10 ||align=right|7
|align=right|45 ||align=right|32 ||align=right|61
|–
|-
|2016
|Pirveli Liga 
|bgcolor=LimeGreen|3
|align=right|16 ||align=right|8 ||align=right|1 ||align=right|7
|align=right|22 ||align=right|17||align=right|22
|2nd Round
|-
|rowspan="2"|2017
|Liga 3 White
|4
|align=right|18 ||align=right|7 ||align=right|7 ||align=right|4
|align=right|22 ||align=right|17||align=right|28
|rowspan="2"|2nd Round
|-
|Relegation Group
|bgcolor=#F1A33F|3
|align=right|18 ||align=right|8 ||align=right|6 ||align=right|4
|align=right|30 ||align=right|21||align=right|30
|-
|2018
|Liga 3 
|7
|align=right|38 ||align=right|18 ||align=right|7 ||align=right|13
|align=right|66 ||align=right|56||align=right|61
|1st Round
|-
|2019
|Liga 3 
|bgcolor=LimeGreen|9
|align=right|36 ||align=right|12 ||align=right|3 ||align=right|21
|align=right|30 ||align=right|57||align=right|39
|Round of 32
|-
|2020
|Liga 4 Red Group
|bgcolor=#F1A33F|3
|align=right|14 ||align=right|7 ||align=right|2 ||align=right|5
|align=right|27 ||align=right|13||align=right|21
|2nd Round
|-
|rowspan="2"|2021
|Liga 4 Red Group
|bgcolor=Gold|1
|align=right|18 ||align=right|13 ||align=right|3 ||align=right|2
|align=right|46 ||align=right|16 ||align=right|42
|rowspan="2"|2nd Round
|-
|Promotion Group
|bgcolor=#F1A33F|3
|align=right|18 ||align=right|11 ||align=right|3 ||align=right|4
|align=right|30 ||align=right|19 ||align=right|36
|-
|2022
|Liga 3 
|8
|align=right|30 ||align=right|12 ||align=right|5 ||align=right|13
|align=right|47 ||align=right|40||align=right|41
|1st Round
|}

Current squad 
As of April 2022

 

(C)

Managers

2018-19 - Koba Tediashvili

2020-22 - Malkhaz Latsabidze

Since November 2022 - Gocha Avsajanishvili

Honours 
Pirveli Liga
 Silver Medal winner (2):  2004-05, 2014-15 (Group B) 
 Third place (2): 1999-2000 (Group A), 2016

Stadium
The club's home ground is a stadium named after Borjomi-born player Jemal Zeinklishvili, who was a member of Dinamo Tbilisi squad during their victorious season in the Soviet Top league in 1964.  

The area was announced unfit for hosting official matches in 2020, which forced the local municipal authorities to unveil reconstruction plans. For this reason, the team was forced to hire Mtskheta Park and the Khashuri stadium for most of their home games during the next three seasons.

Name
Between 1936 and 2004 - FC Tori Borjomi

Since 2004 - FC Borjomi

The term Tori comes from a medieval name of the region where Borjomi and surrounding areas are situated.

FC Tori, another football club based in Borjomi, competed in Regionuli Liga between 2016 and 2022.

References

External links 
Borjomi at UEFA.COM
Borjomi at EUFO.DE
Borjomi at Weltfussball.de

Football clubs in Georgia (country)
Association football clubs established in 1936
FC Borjomi